Ardakan is a city in Yazd Province, Iran.

Ardakan may also refer to:
 Ardakan, Alborz
 Ardakan, Fars
 Ardakan County, in Yazd Province